Anne Quast (born August 31, 1937) is an American amateur golfer. She won the U.S. Women's Amateur three times (1958, 1961, 1963) and was runner-up three times (1965, 1968, 1973). She was married several times and played as Anne Decker, Anne Welts, and Anne Sander.

Career
Quast was born in Everett, Washington. Her parents owned the Cedarcrest Golf Course in Marysville, Washington, and by age 12 she had played in her first tournament. She won the Washington State Junior Girls Championship in 1952 and 1954 then again in 1955, when she also won her state's Women's championship. She repeated as the Washington State Women's champion in 1956. At the 1957 Titleholders Championship for amateurs and professionals, playing as an amateur in this LPGA Tour event, she was runner-up to LPGA Tour star Patty Berg.

Always composed under pressure, Quast's strong short game got her to the U.S. Women's Amateur quarter-finals in 1955, and to the semi-finals in 1956. While a student at Stanford University in 1958, she won the first of her three U.S. Women's Amateur. In 1961 she was living in Seattle where she taught school. Married to Dr. Jay D. Decker, Anne Quast-Decker won the U.S. Women's Amateur again, setting a tournament record for her margin of victory, by 14 and 13; this record still stands. Her marriage did not last, and in 1963, after marrying for the second time, Anne Quast-Welts defeated Peggy Conley to win her third U.S. championship. She also made it to the finals in 1965, 1968, and 1973.

Quast was a member of the U.S. Curtis Cup team in 1958, 1960, 1962, 1966, 1968, 1974, 1984, and 1990; across five decades. Her eight appearances ranks her second all-time to Carol Semple. She was also a member of the Espirito Santo Trophy team in 1966, 1968 and 1988; the U.S. team captured the trophy on all three occasions.

Divorced again, Anne Quast married Steve Sander, and the couple lived in the United Kingdom from 1974 to 1979. In 1980 she was back home in the U.S., but returned to England to compete again in the British Ladies Amateur, which she won. At Pinehurst in North Carolina she won the 1982 and 1983 North and South Women's Amateur. In her first year of eligibility at age fifty, Quast won the 1987 U.S. Senior Women's Amateur then again in 1989, 1990 and 1993.

Awards
A member of the Stanford University Athletic Hall of Fame, in 1997 Anne Quast was inducted into the State of Washington Sports Hall of Fame and in 1999 into the Pacific Northwest Golf Association Hall of Fame.

In his 2001 book, The Golf 100: Ranking the Greatest Golfers of All Time, Robert McCord ranked Quast 37th.

Tournament wins
this list is probably incomplete
1952 Washington State Junior Girls'
1954 Washington State Junior Girls', Women's Western Junior Girls'
1955 Washington State Junior Girls', Washington State Women's Amateur
1956 Washington State Women's Amateur, Hollywood Women's Invitational Four-Ball Champion (with Ruth Jessen), Women's South Atlantic Amateur, Women's Western Amateur
1957 Helen Lee Doherty Invitational
1958 U.S. Women's Amateur
1961 U.S. Women's Amateur, Women's Western Amateur
1963 U.S. Women's Amateur
1980 British Ladies Amateur
1982 North and South Women's Amateur
1983 North and South Women's Amateur
1985 California Women's Amateur
1987 U.S. Senior Women's Amateur
1988 Women's Western Amateur
1989 U.S. Senior Women's Amateur
1990 U.S. Senior Women's Amateur
1993 U.S. Senior Women's Amateur

U.S. national team appearances
Amateur
Curtis Cup: 1958 (tie), 1960 (winners), 1962 (winners), 1966 (winners), 1968 (winners), 1974 (winners), 1984 (winners), 1990 (winners)
Espirito Santo Trophy: 1966 (winners), 1968 (winners), 1988 (winners)

References

American female golfers
Amateur golfers
Stanford Cardinal women's golfers
Winners of ladies' major amateur golf championships
Golfers from Washington (state)
Sportspeople from Everett, Washington
1937 births
Living people